Pierre de Saint-Julien de Balleure (1519–1593) was a Burgundian historian of the Renaissance period.

Born in 1519 at the Château de Balleure (Étrigny), this erudite provincial notably wrote a history of the Burgundians, published while he was Dean of Chalon-sur-Saône. De l’origine des Bourgongnons, et antiquité des estats de Bourgongne was printed in 1581 in Paris, "chez Nicolas Chesneau, ruë Sainct Jacques, au Chesne Verd" (chez Nicolas Chesneau, Rue Saint Jacques, at the [sign of the] green oak).

His tombstone may be seen in the church of Saint-Vincent in Chalon-sur-Saône.

Bibliography
Raffin, Léonce Saint-Julien de Balleure, historien bourguignon, Paris, Champion, 1926.

French untitled nobility
16th-century French historians
1519 births
1593 deaths
French male non-fiction writers